Valor, valour, or valorous may mean:

 Courage, a similar meaning
 Virtue ethics, roughly "courage in defense of a noble cause"

Entertainment
 Valor (band), a Christian gospel music group
 Valor Kand, a member of the band Christian Death
 Valor (TV series), an American drama series
 Valor (DC Comics), a DC Comics superhero
 Valor (EC Comics), an EC Comics title

Sports
 Washington Valor, American football team
 Team Valor International, an American Thoroughbred horse racing stable
 Valour FC, a Canadian soccer club

Other
 Bell V-280 Valor, U.S. army tiltrotor aircraft
 Valor Communications, the former name of Windstream Communications, a telecommunications company
 Valor Ecclesiasticus, a survey of the finances of the church in England, Wales and English-controlled parts of Ireland made in 1535
 Yale & Valor, a UK-based gas boiler manufacturer
 Carnival Valor, a Conquest-class cruise ship operated by Carnival Cruise Line
 , the name of more than one ship of the British Royal Navy
 Team Valor, a team on Pokémon Go
 Valoren number, the analog of ISIN security identifiers for Switzerland

See also
 Válor, a municipality in Spain
 Velour, a plush, knitted fabric or textile